FC Nyva Myronivka was a Ukrainian football club from Myronivka, Kyiv Oblast.

It entered the professional competitions for the 1992-93 Ukrainian Third League season as Nyva-Borysfen Myronivka. It was promoted as Borysfen to the 1993-94 Ukrainian Second League changing its name to FC Boryspil.

The same year for 1993–94 season, another Nyva Myronivka appeared and continued to play in lower leagues until the 1996–97 season.

League and cup history

{|class="wikitable"
|-bgcolor="#efefef"
! Season
! Div.
! Pos.
! Pl.
! W
! D
! L
! GS
! GA
! P
!Domestic Cup
!colspan=2|Europe
!Notes
|-
|align=center|1991
|align=center|4th
|align=center|7
|align=center|27
|align=center|13
|align=center|5
|align=center|9
|align=center|45
|align=center|36
|align=center|31
|align=center|
|align=center|
|align=center|
|align=center|Group 2
|-
|colspan=14 align=center bgcolor=lightgrey|mid-season 1992–93 merged with FC Borysfen Boryspil 
|-
|align=center|1992–93
|align=center|3rd 
|align=center|4
|align=center|34
|align=center|19
|align=center|7
|align=center|8
|align=center|45
|align=center|28
|align=center|45
|align=center|
|align=center|
|align=center|
|align=center bgcolor=lightyellow|Promoted as FC Boryspil
|-
|colspan=14 align=center bgcolor=lightgrey|club restarted as Nyva Karapyshi, later Nyva Myronivka
|-
|align=center|1993–94
|align=center|3rd 
|align=center|7
|align=center|34
|align=center|13
|align=center|10
|align=center|11
|align=center|34
|align=center|26
|align=center|36
|align=center|
|align=center|
|align=center|
|align=center|
|-
|align=center|1994–95
|align=center|3rd 
|align=center bgcolor=silver|2
|align=center|42
|align=center|30
|align=center|8
|align=center|4
|align=center|65
|align=center|17
|align=center|98
|align=center|
|align=center|
|align=center|
|align=center|
|-
|colspan=14 align=center bgcolor=lightgrey|tier liquidated, club admitted to higher tier
|-
|align=center|1995–96
|align=center|3rd
|align=center|6
|align=center|40
|align=center|21
|align=center|10
|align=center|9
|align=center|59
|align=center|36
|align=center|73
|align=center|
|align=center|
|align=center|
|align=center bgcolor=pink|Relegated
|-
|align=center|1996–97
|align=center|4th
|align=center|5/6
|align=center|16
|align=center|1
|align=center|3
|align=center|12
|align=center|7
|align=center|27
|align=center|6
|align=center|
|align=center|
|align=center|
|align=center|
|-
|}

Managers
List of managers
 1992 – 1993 Volodymyr Kolomiets (Nyva-Borysfen Myronivka)
 1994 – 1995 Pavlo Neverov (Nyva Karapyshi/Myronivka)
 1995 – 1996 Volodymyr Spiridonov
 1996 Viktor Ishchenko
 1996 – 1997 Ivan Fliashko

References

 
Nyva Myronivka
Football clubs in Kyiv Oblast
Association football clubs established in 1992
Association football clubs disestablished in 1996
1992 establishments in Ukraine
1996 disestablishments in Ukraine